The Faculty of Humanities is the oldest and one of the most prominent faculties of the University of Sarajevo in Bosnia and Herzegovina. The institution was established on 14 February 1950 by the decision of the People's Republic of Bosnia and Herzegovina.

History
The faculty was established in the post-World War II period on 14 February 1950 by the decision of the People's Republic of Bosnia and Herzegovina. It was established as a part of a unified institution, together with the Faculty of Natural Sciences, and included following eight subject areas: General and National History, Serbo-Croatian language and Yugoslav literature, German language and literature, French language and literature, Oriental Philology, Mathematics, Chemistry and Geography. Professor Anto Babić, one of the founders, was faculty first dean. Dr. Aleksandar Belić, president of the Serbian Academy of Sciences and Arts, delivered inaugural lecture of the institution November 1950. Faculty's main building was designed by Juraj Neidhardt and constructed between 1955 and 1959.

Post-Bosnian War History
In May 2013 faculty organized the First Regional Congress of Art History Students attended by students from University of Sarajevo, University of Mostar, University of Zagreb, University of Rijeka, University of Zadar, University of Belgrade and University of Ljubljana. The congress was opened by the TU Dresden professor Tobias Strahl lecture on cultural cleansing of monuments in 1992-1995 period. In April 2015 faculty reopened lectorate of Slovenian language which was closed in 1993. In September that same year in cooperation with the British Council faculty organized the First International Conference on English Language, Literature, Teaching and Translation Studies.

Publications
Sophos : A Young Researchers Journal

Notable alumni and faculty

Alumni
Some of the former students of the Faculty of Humanities continued their academic and scientific careers at the faculty and the University of Sarajevo.
Aleksa Buha
Dubravko Lovrenović
Dževad Karahasan
Enver Kazaz
Ivo Komšić
Jasna Šamić
Marko Šunjić
Milan Damnjanović
Milan Vasić
Miloš Okuka
Nenad Veličković
Nijaz Ibrulj
Predrag Finci
Ranko Bugarski
Salmedin Mesihović

Faculty
Alojz Benac
Benjamina Karić
Desanka Kovačević-Kojić
Ivan Focht
Marija Kon
Meša Selimović
Milorad Ekmečić
Muhamed Filipović
Nikola Koljević
Senahid Halilović
Svetozar Koljević
Vanja Sutlić

See also
Faculty of Humanities, University of Mostar
University of Belgrade Faculty of Philosophy
Faculty of Philosophy, University of Montenegro
Faculty of Humanities and Social Sciences, University of Zagreb

References

External links
 Homepage
 
 
 

University of Sarajevo
Education in Bosnia and Herzegovina
1950 establishments in Yugoslavia